Polinices immaculatus, common name the immaculate moonsnail, is a species of predatory sea snail, a marine gastropod mollusk in the family Naticidae, the moon snails.

Distribution
This species occurs in the Northwest Atlantic Ocean.

Description 
The maximum recorded shell length is 10 mm.

Habitat 
Minimum recorded depth is 9 m. Maximum recorded depth is 201 m.

References

 Brunel, P., L. Bosse, & G. Lamarche. (1998). Catalogue of the marine invertebrates of the estuary and Gulf of St. Lawrence. Canadian Special Publication of Fisheries and Aquatic Sciences, 126. 405 p.
 Trott, T.J. 2004. Cobscook Bay inventory: a historical checklist of marine invertebrates spanning 162 years. Northeastern Naturalist (Special Issue 2): 261 - 324.
 Torigoe K. & Inaba A. (2011) Revision on the classification of Recent Naticidae. Bulletin of the Nishinomiya Shell Museum 7: 133 + 15 pp., 4 pls.

External links

Naticidae
Gastropods described in 1835